Peer M. Schatz (born August 3, 1965) is a Swiss and Austrian entrepreneur and executive in the life sciences. Among other roles, he was the chief executive officer of QIAGEN N.V. where he over almost 30 years led QIAGEN's development from a startup to a global market and technology leader with over 5100 employees and to a market capitalization of over $10 billion.

Schatz grew up in the United States and Switzerland. After his Matura (A-Levels/ university entrance diploma), Schatz studied business and social sciences at the University of St. Gallen, Switzerland. He graduated with a master's degree in finance in 1989 and obtained a Master of Business Administration (MBA) from the University of Chicago Graduate School in Business in 1990. Schatz worked in different positions for Sandoz AG and Computerland and participated in the foundation of startup companies in the computer and software trading industry in Europe and the United States.

In 1993, Schatz joined QIAGEN and paved the way for both the company's initial public offering at the Nasdaq in 1996 as the first German company ever and the subsequent listing at the Frankfurt Stock Exchange (Germany). He advanced QIAGEN's strategic focus on sample and assay technologies in the molecular diagnostics, applied testing, academic and pharmaceutical markets.

Schatz resigned as CEO October 7, 2019 and transitioned to the role of special advisor. SEC filings list Schatz as the owner of a number of shares and rights on shares which represented about 3% of the outstanding shares of QIAGEN.

Schatz serves as a member of the Managing Board of PS Capital Management GmbH. He is chairman of the board of Resolve Biosciences GmbH as well as of Centogene NV and a member of the supervisory board of Siemens Healthineers AG. He previously held director positions of AdvaMedDx (U.S. in-vitro diagnostics industry organization) and ALDA (U.S. Life Science and Diagnostics Association). From 2001 to 2011, he was a member of the German Corporate Governance Commission.

Schatz is married to Nadine Schatz-Grandjean-Perrenoud-Contesse, a Swiss citizen and likewise an alumna of the University of St. Gallen. He is the son of famous biochemist Gottfried Schatz, who co-discovered mitochondrial DNA.

References

Sources 

Schatz, Peer M
Swiss chief executives
Living people
University of St. Gallen alumni
1965 births